KLWJ (1090 AM, "Kingdom Living Radio") was a daytime-only radio station licensed to serve Umatilla, Oregon, United States. The station, which began broadcasting in 1980, was owned and operated by Umatilla Broadcasting, Inc.

KLWJ formerly broadcast a religious radio format. The station's final license expired in 2006 and KLWJ was deleted from the FCC database in 2009.

History
This station received its original construction permit from the Federal Communications Commission on February 27, 1979. The new station was assigned the call letters KLWJ by the FCC.

In June 1979, an application was filed to transfer the permit to Umatilla Broadcasting, Inc. The transfer was approved by the FCC on July 9, 1979. KLWJ received its license to cover from the FCC on August 25, 1980.

The station's license was cancelled on June 4, 2009, and the KLWJ call sign was deleted from the FCC database.

References

External links
 Query the FCC's AM station database for KLWJ

Defunct religious radio stations in the United States
LWJ
Radio stations established in 1980
Umatilla County, Oregon
Defunct radio stations in the United States
Radio stations disestablished in 2009
1980 establishments in Oregon
LWJ
2009 disestablishments in Oregon
LWJ